Praedora puchneri is a moth of the  family Sphingidae. It is known from the Democratic Republic of Congo.

References

Sphingini
Moths described in 2008